The 2020 Italian local elections were held on different dates; they were originally scheduled to take place in May 2020, together with the 2020 regional elections, with a second round on June, but they were delayed on 20 and 21 September with a second round on 4 and 5 October due to the coronavirus pandemic in Italy. Direct elections were held in 1,172 out of 7,904 municipalities; in each of these, the mayor and the members of the City Council are going to be elected. Of the 1,172 municipalities, 18 are provincial capitals.

The elections in Trentino - Alto Adige/Südtirol were planned to be held on 3 May, with a second ballot on 17 May, while the elections in Aosta Valley were planned on 17 May, with a second ballot on 31 May, but they were delayed following the coronavirus pandemic. In Sicily the elections were planned to be held on 24 May but they were first postponed on 14 June with a second round on 28 June and then they were delayed again sometime between 11 October and 6 December.

Municipal councillors and mayors ordinarily serve a term of five years.

Voting system
All mayoral elections in Italy in cities with a population higher than 15,000 use the same voting system. Under this system, voters express a direct choice for the mayor or an indirect choice voting for the party of the candidate's coalition. If no candidate receives at least 50% of votes, the top two candidates go to a second round after two weeks. This gives a result whereby the winning candidate may be able to claim majority support, although it is not guaranteed.

The election of the City Council is based on a direct choice for the candidate with a preference vote: the candidate with the majority of the preferences is elected. The number of seats for each party is determined proportionally.

Municipal elections

Overall results
Majority of each coalition in the municipalities which have a population higher than 15,000 inhabitants:

Mayoral election results

See also
2020 Venice municipal election

References

2020 elections in Italy
 
 
Municipal elections in Italy
May 2020 events in Italy
June 2020 events in Italy
Italian local elections 2020